Hunter is a city in Cass County, North Dakota, United States. The population was 332 at the 2020 census. Hunter was founded in 1881.

History
Hunter was first called Delano, and under the latter name was platted in 1880 when the railroad was extended to that point. The name Hunter was adopted in 1881 for John Hunter, a local landowner. According to legend, John Hunter promised to help build the town a church in exchange for the naming rights.

Geography
Hunter is located at  (47.1905, -97.2170).

Demographics

2010 census
As of the census of 2010, there were 261 people, 115 households, and 77 families living in the city. The racial makeup of the city was 97.7% White and 2.3% from two or more races.

There were 115 households, of which 27.0% had children under the age of 18 living with them, 54.8% were married couples living together, 3.5% had a female householder with no husband present, 8.7% had a male householder with no wife present, and 33.0% were non-families. 29.6% of all households were made up of individuals, and 12.2% had someone living alone who was 65 years of age or older. The average household size was 2.27 and the average family size was 2.69.

The median age in the city was 44.4 years. 23.4% of residents were under the age of 18; 6.4% were between the ages of 18 and 24; 21% were from 25 to 44; 30.3% were from 45 to 64; and 18.8% were 65 years of age or older. The gender makeup of the city was 52.9% male and 47.1% female.

2000 census
As of the census of 2000, there were 326 people, 141 households, and 84 families living in the city. The population density was 212.4 people per square mile (81.7/km2). There were 160 housing units at an average density of 104.2 per square mile (40.1/km2). The racial makeup of the city was 98.47% White, and 1.53% from two or more races. Hispanic or Latino of any race were 1.23% of the population.

There were 141 households, out of which 24.8% had children under the age of 18 living with them, 51.8% were married couples living together, 5.0% had a female householder with no husband present, and 40.4% were non-families. 37.6% of all households were made up of individuals, and 22.7% had someone living alone who was 65 years of age or older. The average household size was 2.31 and the average family size was 3.00.

In the city, the population was spread out, with 27.9% under the age of 18, 3.7% from 18 to 24, 23.6% from 25 to 44, 19.6% from 45 to 64, and 25.2% who were 65 years of age or older. The median age was 40 years. For every 100 females there were 90.6 males. For every 100 females age 18 and over, there were 95.8 males.

The median income for a household in the city was $38,750, and the median income for a family was $47,500. Males had a median income of $31,477 versus $22,000 for females. The per capita income for the city was $25,100. None of the families and 1.7% of the population were living below the poverty line, including no under eighteens and 5.5% of those over 64.

Notable person
Edgar S. Furniss (born 1890), economist
Roger L. Worsley (born 1937), educator

References

External links
 Hunter, North Dakota is at coordinates .
 Hunter, North Dakota :bicentennial community, 1976 from the Digital Horizons website

Cities in Cass County, North Dakota
Cities in North Dakota
Populated places established in 1881
1881 establishments in Dakota Territory